Leonardo Nemer Caldeira Brant (born 15 July 1966) is a Brazilian jurist and International law scholar. He serves as judge of the International Court of Justice since 4 November 2022. He is also a professor at the Federal University of Minas Gerais (UFMG) and the founder of the International Law Center (CEDIN), in Belo Horizonte.

He was elected to the ICJ in the 2022 election following the death of Antônio Augusto Cançado Trindade. Brant had previously ran unsuccessfully for the International Criminal Court judges election, 2014.

Education
Brant graduated from the School of Law, Federal University of Minas Gerais, in 1991. In the same year, he obtained a Diploma of Advanced Studies in Human Rights at the Inter-American Institute of Human Rights. In 1993, he obtained a Master's Dregree in International Law at the Federal University of Minas Gerais, with the thesis "The Right to Development as a Human Right".

From 1996 to 2000, Brant studied at Université Paris X - Nanterre, France, where he obtained his PhD. He was awarded Doctor of International Law with the thesis "L’autorité de la chose jugée en Droit International Public". His thesis was awarded with the "Prix du Ministère de la Recherche - Département Sciences de la Société de la République Française-Paris" in 2000. He also obtained a Diploma in Advanced Studies at the Institut International des Droits de L'Homme, Strasbourg, France (1996) and a Diploma in Advanced Studies at the United Nations Study Programme, Geneva, Switzerland (1997).

Career
Brant started as a Professor of Public International Law and International Criminal Law at Federal University of Minas Gerais, in Belo Horizonte, Brazil. From 2000 to 2021, he was also a Tenured Professor of Public International Law at the Pontifícia Universidade Católica de Minas Gerais in Belo Horizonte.

From 2003 to 2004 he worked as a Legal Advisor at the Juridical Department of the International Court of Justice (ICJ).

In 2005, Brant founded the Brazilian International Law Center (CEDIN), a research center specialized in International law, Humanitarian law, International criminal law and International Security. CEDIN and its associates have held important international events such as Congresses and Seminars. Furthermore, the Center has coordinated several profound studies on specific areas of International Law.

Brant also founded the Brazilian Yearbook of International Law, in 2006. He is the Chief editor of the periodical, which is published in several foreign languages and distributed to the largest and most relevant Universities and international academic centers. Its main goal is to establish in the country an annual publication engaged in the promotion and consolidation of the Latin-American view of International Law.

In 2007 Brant worked at Université Caen Basse-Normandie, France, as a visiting professor. In 2009, also as a visiting professor at the Institut des Hautes Études Internationales, he taught at the Université Panthéon Assas Paris II, France. In the same year, we was a Visiting Fellow at the Lauterpacht Centre, Cambridge University, United Kingdom. The following year, at the XXXVII Course on International Law of the Organization of American States (OAS). Brant was also a visiting professor at Université Paris-Ouest Nanterre la Défense, in 2013. From 2016 to 2017, he worked as visiting professor at L’Institut d’Études Politiques d’Aix-en-Provence - SciencesPo Aix,France.

In June 2014, Brant was officially indicated by the Brazilian Government to the application to the charge of judge at the International Criminal Court. The judges elected during the 13th session of the Assembly of States Parties to the Rome Statute of the International Criminal Court scheduled for 8 to 17 December 2014 in New York, will serve for nine years until 2024.

Professional Experiences

2018: Member of the list of judges for the composition of the Special Tribunal for Lebanon, The Netherlands.

2016 - 2017: Visiting Professor at the L’Institut d’Études Politiques d’Aix-en-Provence - SciencesPo Aix, France.

2013: Member of the Advisory Committee, Organization for Economic Co-operation and Development (OECD).

2013 - 2014: Former Member of the Advisory Committee for Nominations of the International Criminal Court (ICC), The Hague.

2013: Visiting Professor at the Université Paris-Ouest Nanterre la Défense, France.

2011: Speaker at Gilberto Amado Memorial Lecture.

2010: Instructor at the XXXVII Training Course for Jurists of the Organization of American States (OAS), Rio de Janeiro, Brazil.

2009: Visiting Professor at the Institut des Hautes Études Internationales – Université Panthéon Assas Paris II, France.

2009: Visiting Researcher at the Lauterpacht Centre, Cambridge University, United Kingdom.

2007: Visiting Professor at Université Caen Basse-Normandie, France.

2007: Konrad Adenauer Stiftung Conference, Cologne, Germany.

2007: President of International Relations Commission of the Brazilian Bar Association of Minas Gerais (OAB-MG), Brazil.

2006 - current: President and Founder of the Brazilian Yearbook of International Law.

2005 – 2006: Director of the Brazilian branch of the International Law Association (ILA), Brazil.

2005 - current: President and Founder of the International Law Winter Program, Brazil.

2004 – 2008: Director of the International Law branch at the Minas Gerais Bar Association (IA-MG), Brazil.

2003: Lecturer at L’Université de Dijon, Dijon, France.

2003 - 2004: Legal Officer on the Registry of the Legal Department of the International Court of Justice (ICJ), The Hague.

2000 - current: President and Founder of the International Law Center (CEDIN), Brazil.

2000 - 2022: Lawyer and Partner at Nemer and Guimarães Chamber, Brazil.

2000 - 2021: Tenured Professor of International Public Law of the Pontifícia Universidade Católica de Minas Gerais, Brazil.

1994-1995 and 2005-2009: Legal Advisor of International Affairs of the Municipality of Belo Horizonte, Brazil.

1994 - current: Tenured Professor of International Public Law of the Federal University of Minas Gerais, Brazil.

Selected Publications

 BRANT, L. N. C. (Org.). Comentário à Carta das Nações Unidas: artigo por artigo. Belo Horizonte: CEDIN, 2008. 1340p.
 BRANT, L. N. C. A Corte Internacional de Justiça e a construção do Direito Internacional. Belo Horizonte: CEDIN, 2005. 1291p.
 BRANT, L. N. C.; LAGE, D. A.; CREMASCO, S. S. (Org.). Direito Internacional contemporâneo. Curitiba: Juruá, 2011. 872p.
 BRANT, L. N. C.; DINIZ, P. I. R. (Org.). Agenda 2030 e o desenvolvimento sustentável no contexto latino-americano. Belo Horizonte: CEDIN, 2020. 160p.
 BRANT, L. N. C. L’autorité de la chose jugée en Droit International Public. Paris: LGDJ, 2004. 396p
 BRANT, L. N. C.; STEINER, S. H. (Org.). O Tribunal Penal Internacional: comentários ao Estatuto de Roma. Belo Horizonte: Del Rey, 2015. 1688p.
 BRANT, L. N. C. (Org.). O Brasil e os novos desafios do Direito Internacional. Rio de Janeiro: Forense, 2004. 712p.
 BRANT, L. N. C. (Org.). Direito e terrorismo: os impactos do terrorismo na Comunidade internacional e no Brasil: perspectivas jurídico-políticas. Rio de Janeiro: Forense, 2002. 570p.
 BRANT, L. N. C. Teoria geral do direito internacional público. Belo Horizonte: O Lutador, 2020. 607p.
 BRANT, L. N. C; SILVA, T. M. (Org.). Mineração em terras indígenas na América Latina: desenvolvimento e meio ambiente. Belo Horizonte: CEDIN; Konrad Adenauer Stiftung; EKLA-Programa Regional de Segurança Energética e Mudanças Climáticas, 2021. 183p.
 BRANT, L. N. C. Para entender o funcionamento da Corte Internacional de Justiça:  processo contencioso e sentença. 7. ed. Curitiba: Juruá, 2012. 157p.

2014 International Criminal Court judges election

During the 13th session of the Assembly of States Parties to the Rome Statute of the International Criminal Court, scheduled for 8 to 17 December 2014 in New York, six judges of the International Criminal Court were elected. Professor Brant was an unsuccessful candidate for this election.

During the 19th Session in 2020, the Assembly of States Parties to the Rome Statute of the International Criminal Court, elected six judges of the International Criminal Court. To run for the post of judge at the ICC, the Brazilian Federal Government nominated Mônica Jacqueline Sifuentes. However, Marcos Coelho Zilli and Brant were among  the names suggested by the Brazilian national group in the Permanent Court of Arbitration (PCA).

2022 International Court of Justice judges election

Brant was one of the two Brazilian candidates running for the 2022 International Court of Justice judges election. In October, he was elected judge in replacement of Antônio Augusto Cançado Trindade. According to Opinio Juris (blog), he will "continue Latin America’s legal legacy at the Court, after the passing of Judge Trindade".

References

Living people
Brazilian jurists
1966 births